This is a list of Western Australian locomotive classes, being classes of locomotive that have worked on railways in Western Australia.

The majority of Western Australian steam locomotive classes were operated by the Western Australian Government Railways (WAGR). Regularly scheduled steam working ceased on WAGR mainline operations after 1971 - with only special excursion or enthusiasts trains being hauled by steam after that time.

Other significant operators include the Commonwealth Railways, the Midland Railway Company of Western Australia and State Saw Mills. Many private organisations also operated steam locomotives in Western Australia.

Locomotives

Western Australian Government Railway

Midland Railway Company of Western Australia 
(In order of introduction on the Midland railway.)

Commonwealth Railways

Other Diesel locomotives

BHP
(In order of introduction on the Goldsworthy and Mount Newman railways.)
 CM39-8
 CM40-8M
 CM40-8
 GE AC6000CW
 EMD SD40R
 EMD SD40-2
 EMD SD70ACe

Cliffs Robe River Iron Associates 
(In order of introduction on the Robe River railway.)
 ALCO RSC-3 (ex NSWGR 40 class)
 MLW M-636
 ALCO Century 630

Australian National 
(In order of introduction on the Trans-Australian Railway.)
 AL/ALF class
 BL class
 DL class
 EL class
 AN class

CBH Group
 CBH class

Fortescue Metals Group

(In order of introduction on the Fortescue railway.)  
 GE Dash 9-44CW
 EMD SD90MAC-H
 EMD SD9043MAC
 EMD SD70ACe

Goldsworthy Mining 
(In order of introduction on the Goldsworthy railway.)
 Class B (similar to WAGR H class)
 Class A (similar to WAGR K class)

Hamersley Iron 

(In order of introduction on the Hamersley railway.)
 ALCO S-2
 ALCO Century 628
 ALCO Century 415
 ALCO Century 636
 MLW M-636
 GE C36-7
 EMD SD50S
 GE Dash 9-44CW

Lakewood Firewood Co 
 LFC 1

Mineral Resources
 MRL class

Mount Newman Mining 
(In order of introduction on the Mount Newman railway.)
 EMD F7A
 ALCO Century 636
 MLW M-636
 CM36-7
 CM39-8

Pacific National
 AN class
 BL class
 DL class
 G class
 NR class
 XRB class
 80 class
 81 class

Pilbara Iron 
 GE Dash 9-44CW

SCT Logistics
 SCT class
 CSR class

South Spur Rail Services
 D47, D48, D49, D51
 F40
 K205, K206, K210
 KA212
 NA1874
 R1902
 ZB2120, ZB2125, ZB2129
 602, 603, 607

Watco Australia
 G class
 FL/HL class 
 DR class

See also 

 Locomotives of the Western Australian Government Railways
 Rail transport in Western Australia

References

Notes 

 Register of New Zealand Railways Steam Locomotives 1863–1971. Pages 59 & 158.

Primary sources 
 State Records Office has a web page with the largest collection of records available about the WAGR.

Further reading 

 Finlayson, Don (Ed.), (1986). "Steam Around Perth", Australian Railway Historical Society W.A. Division (Inc), Bassendean, W.A. 

 McNicol, Steve. (1994) W.A.G.R. steam locomotives in preservation Elizabeth, S. Aust. : Railmac Publications.

External links 

 Locopage/Railpage
 Table of Information
 Preserved Fleet
 Diesel Fleet

Railways
Locomotive classes
Western Australia